Two Can Play is a Canadian drama film, directed by Micheline Lanctôt and released in 1993. The film stars Pascale Bussières and Pascale Paroissien as adult sisters meeting for the first time, not having previously known of each other's existence, and intersperses the dramatic storyline with scenes in which the actresses are interviewed about the process of building their characters.

The film won the L.E. Ouimet-Molson Prize from the Association québécoise des critiques de cinéma in 1994, and Lanctôt was a Genie Award nominee for Best Director at the 15th Genie Awards.

Production
The film received $237,000 in funding from the Canada Council.

References

Works cited

External links

1993 films
Canadian drama films
Films directed by Micheline Lanctôt
1993 drama films
French-language Canadian films
1990s Canadian films